Senate Energy and Natural Resources Subcommittee on National Parks is one of four subcommittees of the U.S. Senate Energy and Natural Resources Committee.

Jurisdiction
This subcommittee's jurisdiction includes oversight and legislative responsibilities for: the National Park System; Wild and Scenic Rivers System; National Trails System; national recreation areas; national monuments; historic sites; military parks and battlefields; Land and Water Conservation Fund; historic preservation; outdoor recreation resources; and preservation of prehistoric ruins and objects of interest on the public domain.

Members, 118th Congress

See also
 U.S. House Natural Resources Subcommittee on National Parks, Forests and Public Lands

References

External links
U.S. Senate Energy and Natural Resources Subcommittee on National Parks, official web site

Energy Senate National Parks